Dichagyris leucomelas is a moth of the family Noctuidae. It is widespread in the Near East and Middle East, from Kirghizia, Uzbekistan, Tajikistan to Afghanistan, north Pakistan, north India and Iran.

Adults are on wing from May to July. There is only one generation per year.

External links
Noctuinae of Israel

leucomelas
Insects of Turkey
Moths of the Middle East
Moths described in 1941